Events from the year 1852 in art.

Events
 February 5 – Hermitage Museum first opens to the public in Saint Petersburg.
 June 1 – The Hôtel Drouot is inaugurated in Paris as a fine art auction gallery.

Works
 Théodore Chassériau – Le Harem (approximate date)
 Frederic Edwin Church - The Natural Bridge, Virginia
 Gustave Courbet
 Village Damsels
 A Girl Spinning
 Thomas Couture – Anselm Feuerbach
 Anselm Feuerbach – Hafiz at the Fountain
 Hiroshige – Thirty-six Views of Mount Fuji (first publication)
 William Holman Hunt – Our English Coasts, 1852 ('Strayed Sheep')
 George Inness – A Bit of the Roman Aqueduct
 George Jones – Turner's Gallery; the Artist Showing his Work
 Frederic Leighton – The Death of Brunelleschi
 John Martin – The Destruction of Sodom and Gomorrah

 John Everett Millais
 A Huguenot
 Ophelia
 François Rude – Joan of Arc (marble)
 John Steell – The Duke of Wellington (equestrian bronze, Edinburgh)
 Frederick August Wenderoth and Charles Christian Nahl – Miners in the Sierras

Exhibitions
 The Society of Arts holds Exhibition of Recent Specimens of Photography, a photographic exhibition in London, the first of its kind.

Publications
 Edward Lear – Journal of a Landscape Painter in Southern Calabria

Births
 April 1 – Edwin Austin Abbey, American painter and illustrator (died 1911)
 April 12 – Petar Ubavkić, Serbian sculptor and painter (died 1910)
 April 18 – George Clausen, English artist (died 1944)
 May 18 – Gertrude Käsebier, née Stanton, American portrait photographer (died 1934)
 July 27 – Edward Onslow Ford, English sculptor (died 1901)
 September 21 – Edmund Leighton, English historical genre painter (died 1922)

Deaths
 January 1 – Kapiton Pavlov, Russian portrait painter (born 1791)
 February 10 – Samuel Prout, English watercolour painter (born 1783)
 February 24 – John Frazee, first American-born sculptor to execute a bust in marble (born 1790)
 March 9 - Anson Dickinson, American painter of miniature portraits (born 1779)
 April 5 – William Cuming, Irish portrait painter (born 1769)
 May 30 – George Chinnery, English painter working in China (born 1774)
 June 4 – James Pradier, Swiss-born French sculptor in the neoclassical style (born 1790)
 June 11 – Karl Briullov, Russian painter who transitioned from the Russian neoclassicism to romanticism (born 1799)
 July 12 – Pieter Christoffel Wonder, Dutch painter, active in England (born 1780)
 August 4 – Alfred d'Orsay, French painter, sculptor and patron of the arts (born 1801)
 August 14 – Eberhard Georg Friedrich von Wächter, German painter (born 1762)
 September 14 – Augustus Pugin, English architect, illustrator and designer (born 1812)
 September 20 – William Finden, English engraver (born 1787)
 September 23 – John Vanderlyn, American painter in the neoclassical style (born 1775)
 October 17 – Henri Decaisne, Belgian historical and portrait painter (born 1799)
 October 26 – Johann Erdmann Hummel, German painter (born 1769)
 October 29 – Étienne-Jules Ramey, French sculptor and teacher (born 1796)
 December 18 – Horatio Greenough, American sculptor (born 1805)

References

 
Years of the 19th century in art
1850s in art